Cornelius "Con" Kelleher (born 1891) was an Irish Gaelic footballer who played as a forward for the Cork senior team.

Kelleher made his first appearance for the team during the 1910 championship and was a regular member of the starting fifteen for just two seasons. During that time he won a set of All-Ireland and Munster winners' medals.

At club level Kelleher was a multiple county championship medalist with Macroom.

References

1891 births
Macroom Gaelic footballers
Cork inter-county Gaelic footballers
Winners of one All-Ireland medal (Gaelic football)
20th-century deaths